Strozza is a comune (municipality) in the Province of Bergamo in the Italian region of Lombardy, located about  northeast of Milan and about  northwest of Bergamo.

Strozza borders the following municipalities: Almenno San Bartolomeo, Almenno San Salvatore, Capizzone, Roncola, Ubiale Clanezzo.

References